Diamond Dave is the sixth and most recent studio album by David Lee Roth, former lead vocalist of Van Halen. It was released in 2003 on Magna Carta Records.

Background
The album was recorded at Henson Recording Studios in Hollywood, California. It consists mostly of covers of older hard rock and blues songs, and has an overall laid back bluesy sound. Two of the tracks—a remake of the 1978 Van Halen song "Ice Cream Man" and a cover of "Bad Habits"—had been recorded in 1996, but were not released at that time.

Track listing
"You Got the Blues, Not Me..." (Chris Youlden) - cover of "I'm Tired" by Savoy Brown – 3:17 
"Made Up My Mind" (Savoy Brown) – 3:00
"Stay While the Night is Young" (Youlden) - cover of Savoy Brown – 3:43
"Shoo Bop" (Steve Miller) - cover of "Shu Ba Da Du Ma Ma Ma Ma" by Steve Miller Band – 5:11
"She's Looking Good" (Rodger Collins) – 2:50
"Soul Kitchen" (John Densmore, Robby Krieger, Ray Manzarek, Jim Morrison) - cover of The Doors – 4:32
"If 6 Was 9" (Jimi Hendrix) - cover of The Jimi Hendrix Experience – 3:32
"That Beatles Tune" (John Lennon, Paul McCartney) - cover of "Tomorrow Never Knows" by The Beatles – 3:49
"Medicine Man" (David Lee Roth) – 1:12 
"Let It All Hang Out" (William David Cunningham) – 2:25
"Thug Pop" (Roth, John Lowery) – 3:35
"Act One" (Roth) – 1:34
"Ice Cream Man" (John Brim) – 3:23
"Bad Habits" (William Bruce Field, Thomas Shelton Price) - cover of Billy Field – 3:44

Personnel

David Lee Roth - vocals, harmonica (tracks 2, 9), producer
Brian Young - guitar (tracks 1 - 6, 8, 11)
Jeremy Zuckerman - guitar (tracks 2 - 4, 7, 8, 10, 11), accordion, Fender Rhodes piano (track 5), Hammond B-3 organ (tracks 2, 4, 7), percussion, programming, engineer, producer, digital editing, sound design
Toshi Hiketa - guitar (tracks 5, 8)
Nile Rodgers - guitar (track 13)
Ron Richotte - guitar (track 14)
James Lomenzo - bass (tracks 1 - 8, 11)
Tracy Wormworth - bass (track 13)
James Hunting - bass (track 14)
Ray Luzier - drums (tracks 1 - 8, 11), backing vocals
Omar Hakim - drums (track 13)
Gregg Bissonette - drums (track 14)
Alex Gibson - percussion (tracks 3, 8), accordion (track 3), mellotron (track 8), guitar (track 10), backing vocals, producer, engineer, mixing
Zac Rae - keyboards (track 6)
Greg Phillinganes - piano (track 13)
Brett Tuggle - keyboards (track 14)
Scott Page - alto saxophone, baritone saxophone (tracks 1, 5)
Edgar Winter - saxophone (tracks 13, 14)
Lee Thornburg - trumpet, trombone (track 1)
Jaime Sickora - cowbell (track 1)
Nathan Jenkins - programming (track 10), producer
The Crowell Sisters - backing vocals (track 13)
Kevin Mills - engineer
Brian Humphrey - engineer
Brian Gardner - mastering
Neil Zlozower - photography

Charts

References

External links
AllMusic: Diamond Dave

2003 albums
David Lee Roth albums
Covers albums